Austín Gerardo Berry Moya (born 5 April 1971) is a Costa Rican former professional footballer who played as a midfielder.

Club career
Berry started his professional career with Alajuelense with whom he stayed for 10 years except for a short stint in Germany with SC Freiburg. After a season in Guatemala with Antigua, he joined Herediano in 2000 and retired from playing football in 2006.

Doping case
On 24 July 1996, it was confirmed Berry tested positive of Phenmetrazine after a league game on 7 July 1996 against Cartaginés and was subsequently banned for two months.

International career
In 1989, Berry played for Costa Rica U-20 at the 1989 FIFA World Youth Championship in Saudi Arabia.

He made his debut for the senior national team in a June 1991 friendly match against Colombia and collected a total of 65 caps, scoring 6 goals. He has represented his country in 16 FIFA World Cup qualification matches and played at the 1995, 1997 and 2001 UNCAF Nations Cups as well as at the 1991, 1998 and 2000 CONCACAF Gold Cups and the 1997 and 2001 Copa América. He also was a non-playing squad member at the 2002 CONCACAF Gold Cup.

He played his last international in a March 2002 friendly against Morocco but missed out on the 2002 FIFA World Cup squad.

Managerial career
In May 2010 he was appointed Director of the Institute of Sport and Recreation but resigned two weeks later after critics claimed he lacked experience for the position. He later became assistant manager at Herediano.

Personal life
Berry is the son of Esmeralda Moya and Austin Berry. He was married to Glenda Peraza and divorced on 2014. They had one daughter named Kianny. Berry has two daughters, Krissia and Camila with Margarita Torres prior to his marriage.

References

External links
 

1971 births
Living people
Footballers from San José, Costa Rica
Association football midfielders
Costa Rican footballers
Costa Rica under-20 international footballers
Costa Rica international footballers
1991 CONCACAF Gold Cup players
1997 Copa América players
1998 CONCACAF Gold Cup players
2000 CONCACAF Gold Cup players
2001 UNCAF Nations Cup players
2001 Copa América players
2002 CONCACAF Gold Cup players
L.D. Alajuelense footballers
SC Freiburg players
C.S. Herediano footballers
Liga FPD players
Bundesliga players
2. Bundesliga players
Costa Rican expatriate footballers
Expatriate footballers in Germany
Expatriate footballers in Guatemala
Costa Rican football managers
Doping cases in association football
Copa Centroamericana-winning players
Antigua GFC players
Costa Rican expatriate sportspeople in Germany
Costa Rican expatriate sportspeople in Guatemala